Namrata Shrestha is a Nepalese model and Miss Nepal World 2020.

Pageantry

Miss Nepal 2016
Namrata participated in  Miss Nepal 2016 and reached until Top 5 on that year.

Miss Nepal 2020
Namrata won Miss Nepal World 2020 succeeding Anushka Shrestha and received Rs 250,000 cash and a scooter. She had previously participated in Miss Nepal 2016.

References

Miss Nepal winners
Living people
Year of birth missing (living people)
Nepalese female models
Nepalese beauty pageant winners
Miss World 2021 delegates